Ulrich Le Pen (born 23 January 1974) is a French former professional footballer who played as a midfielder. He spent most of his career in his native France apart from a short stint at Ipswich Town.

Career 
Born in Auray, Brittany, Le Pen began his professional career with Rennes where he spent six years. In 110 games, he scored once. Either a winger or central midfielder, he is renowned for his passing. He moved to Laval where he scored 14 goals in 50 games within two seasons. In 1999, he moved to Lorient, where in two seasons he scored 14 times in 63 games, scoring every 4.5 games. He stayed with Lorient until November 2001.

Despite interest from Rangers F.C he was then transferred to Premier League side Ipswich Town for FRF 15 million (GBP 1.4 million). He only played once in the league against Bolton Wanderers, but got injured almost immediately resulting in only 12 minutes of play for the club. He made one more appearance that season in the FA Cup and another the following season in the UEFA Cup, but he never played again in a league game for Ipswich; it is assumed that he and his family never really settled in England.

After that short taste of Premier League football, he returned to France and joined Strasbourg permanently in 2003 after a loan spell. He scored 16 times in 105 games and scored Strasbourg's first goal of the 2005–06 season with a free kick. While at Strasbourg Le Pen played as a substitute as they won the 2005 Coupe de la Ligue Final. He left to join FC Lorient in 2006. On 25 June 2009 the 35-year-old winger left FC Lorient to sign for Stade Lavallois.

Later career
In November 2017 Le Pen revealed that he had begun coaching Laval's U9's.

References

1974 births
Living people
People from Auray
Sportspeople from Morbihan
Association football midfielders
Footballers from Brittany
French footballers
Ipswich Town F.C. players
Stade Rennais F.C. players
Stade Lavallois players
FC Lorient players
RC Strasbourg Alsace players
Ligue 1 players
Premier League players
Expatriate footballers in England
French expatriate footballers